Ruth Delia Kearney (born 11 November 1984) is an Irish actress, best known for her roles as Jess Parker in Primeval, Daisy in The Following, and London in Flaked, a series on Netflix.

Early life
Kearney was born in London, England, to Irish parents before relocating to Dublin, Ireland, at five years old. She grew up just outside of Dublin in a small town by the coast called Monkstown. She attended St. Andrew's College, Booterstown, and then studied Drama and Classics at Trinity College, Dublin, graduating with honours, before training at the Bristol Old Vic Theatre School, graduating in 2009. Her career began in theatre, with performances in productions such as Man of Mode alongside Antonia Thomas and Theo James, On the Razzle, Three Sisters, Oh! What a lovely War! and Othello.

Career
Kearney is best known for her leading role as Jess Parker in the science fiction-drama Primeval, Kearney joined the cast in 2011 and appeared in both Series 4 and Series 5 of the show

In 2014, she guest-starred in the FX political thriller Tyrant, playing the role of Katharina.

In 2015 Kearney played the recurring role of Daisy Locke in the third season of the Fox American television psychological thriller series The Following.

She stars as the female lead London in the Netflix original comedy series Flaked alongside Will Arnett. Kearney portrays an attractive newcomer to Venice who gets caught in a love triangle with the characters portrayed by Will Arnett and David Sullivan. The role is Kearney's first major comedy television series. The series premièred on 11 March 2016 with all eight episodes released simultaneously.

Flaked returned for a second reduced season in 2017. Ruth Kearney also guest starred in the first season of ePix's Get Shorty as Becca Morgan; her first episode aired in September 2017.

Personal life
Kearney is married to British actor Theo James, who she has been in a relationship with since 2009. They met at the Bristol Old Vic Theatre School and married at the Islington Town Hall on 25 August 2018. They have a daughter born in 2021.

Filmography

References

External links

1984 births
Living people
21st-century Irish actresses
Irish television actresses
Alumni of Bristol Old Vic Theatre School
People educated at St Andrew's College, Dublin
Alumni of Trinity College Dublin